Allan Quadros Garcês, better known as Allan Garcês (born August 30, 1969) is a Brazilian doctor and politician. He is married to Kelly Cris Santos.

Political career 
In 2010, Allan Garcês endorsed Jackson Lago and José Serra.

In 2012, Allan Garcês ran for councilman of São Luís, without success. Endorsed João Castelo.

In 2014, Allan Garcês endorsed Aécio Neves.

In 2016, Allan Garcês ran for alderman of São Luís, without success. Endorsed Eduardo Braide.

Impeachment of Dilma Rousseff 
Garcês was responsible for convening demonstrators for the departure of president Dilma Rousseff. Garcês is the Come to the Street movement.

References 

Living people
1969 births
Brazilian Social Democracy Party politicians
Party of the Brazilian Woman politicians